Richard Horne (born 16 July 1982) is the head coach at Doncaster in Betfred League 1, and a former professional rugby league footballer who played in the 1990s, 2000s and 2010s.

Background
Horne was born in Kingston upon Hull, Humberside. He is the older brother of the rugby league footballer; Graeme Horne.

Career
Horne made his début for Hull at the age of 16, and spent his entire career with the club. He has also played for Great Britain, and Scotland.

Horne played at stand-off half for Hull in the 2005 Challenge Cup Final victory against the Leeds Rhinos.

He set a Super League record of tries scored in succession by scoring tries in 13 consecutive games during 2006's Super League XI. Hull reached the 2006 Super League Grand final to be contested against St. Helens, and Horne played at scrum half back in his side's 4–26 loss.

On 27 October 2008, it was announced that Horne had signed a new three-year deal with Hull.

On 17 January 2010, Horne played his testimonial match against neighbours, Hull Kingston Rovers and Hull F.C. won, 28–16 in front of a crowd of over 16,000 supporters, and former Hull player Steve Prescott paid tribute to Horne.

Horne announced his retirement at the end of the 2014 season to become assistant coach to Lee Radford alongside Chris Tuson & Andy Last. In June 2017 Horne was announced as the new head coach of Doncaster R.L.F.C. taking over from Gary Thornton who left the club in May.

References

External links
!Great Britain Statistics at englandrl.co.uk (statistics currently missing due to not having appeared for both Great Britain, and England)
(archived by web.archive.org) Richard Horne's Official Testimonial Website
(archived by web.archive.org) 2001 Ashes profile

1982 births
Living people
Doncaster R.L.F.C. coaches
English people of Scottish descent
English rugby league coaches
English rugby league players
Great Britain national rugby league team players
Hull F.C. players
Rugby league five-eighths
Rugby league fullbacks
Rugby league halfbacks
Rugby league wingers
Scotland national rugby league team players
Rugby league players from Kingston upon Hull
Yorkshire rugby league team players